Lizama is a surname. Notable people with the surname include:
Augustin Lizama (born 1979/1980), one of the murderers of Stephanie Kuhen
Bastián Lizama (born 1996), Chilean badminton player
Claudio Lizama (born 1973), Chilean footballer
Rosa Adriana Díaz Lizama (born 1973), Mexican politician

Spanish-language surnames